A white knight is a fictional stock character representing a gallant knight.

White Knight may also refer to:

People and titles
 White Knight (Fitzgibbon family), a Hiberno-Norman title of nobility
 Lewis Carroll, who referred to himself as White Knight

Art, entertainment and media

Fictional entities
 Knight-errant, a literary stock character portrayed as a white knight
 White Knight (Through the Looking-Glass), a character in Through the Looking Glass which resembles the chess-piece
 "Gotham's White Knight", a nickname given to Harvey Dent in The Dark Knight (2008)
 White Knight, James Bond's codename while infiltrating a terrorist military base in the beginning of Tomorrow Never Dies
 White Knight, a character in the Generator Rex cartoon series
 White Knight, a playable character class in the popular MMORPG MapleStory
 White Knight, the name of the train engine in the Tokyopop manga Snow
 The Knights of Falador, a fictional organisation in the online game RuneScape

Games
 Knight (chess), playing piece in the game of chess
 White knight, a knight in chess
 White Knight Chronicles, a video game by Level-5 for the PlayStation 3 and PlayStation 4

Film and television 
 White Knight (film), an Indian short documentary film directed by Aarti Shrivastava
 "The White Knight" (The Legend of Zelda), an episode of The Legend of Zelda
 "White Knights" (Legends of Tomorrow), an episode of Legends of Tomorrow

Other
 The White Knight (book), a 1952 biography of Lewis Carroll
 "The White Knight" (Cledus Maggard song), a 1976 hit single by Cledus Maggard
 Batman: White Knight, a comic series by Sean Murphy
 White Knight (album), by Todd Rundgren

Vehicles
 Scaled Composites White Knight, the aircraft used to carry and launch Scaled Composites SpaceShipOne
 Scaled Composites White Knight Two, the technological successor of the first
 Posnansky/Fronius PF-1 White Knight, a glider
 HMM-165, a helicopter squadron in the US Marine Corps, nicknamed White Knights
 White knight (intelligence firm), an organization owned by Joel Zamel

Other uses
 White knight (business), a friendly investor that acquires a corporation
 White Knight (chocolate), an Australian mint flavored chocolate candy bar
 White Knight (software), a terminal program for Macintosh computers
 White Knights of the Ku Klux Klan, one of the most violent and militant branches of the Ku Klux Klan

See also
 John Hunyadi, nicknamed the White Knight of Wallachia
 White horse (disambiguation)
 White night (disambiguation)